Chhidru , is a village and union council of Mianwali District in the Punjab province of Pakistan. It is part of Mianwali Tehsil and is located at 32°32'36N 71°46'25E.

References

Union councils of Mianwali District
Populated places in Mianwali District